The Ottoman Turkish magazine Hamiyet ("patriotism") appeared in Istanbul in 1886 with a total of 17 issues.

References

Defunct magazines published in Turkey
Magazines established in 1886
Magazines published in Istanbul
Turkish-language magazines
Magazines with year of disestablishment missing